Dominic Haakon Myrtved Purcell (born 17 February 1970) is a British-Australian actor. He is best known for his portrayals of Lincoln Burrows in Fox's Prison Break (2005–2009; 2017) and Mick Rory / Heat Wave in The CW's The Flash (2014–2016) and Legends of Tomorrow (2016–2021), as well as Drake / Dracula in Blade: Trinity (2004). He is also known for his role as Lewis "Lew" Brookbank in the 2004 film Three-Way.

Early life
Purcell was born in Wallasey, Cheshire (now Merseyside), England. He is the son of Phil Myrtvedt and Maureen (née Clarke) Purcell. His mother was Irish and his father was of Norwegian and English descent. In 1972, he and his family moved to Bondi, New South Wales in Australia, and later to Western Sydney in Penrith.  He attended St Finbars primary School and Blaxland High School, as well as St Dominic's College and McCarthy Catholic College, Emu Plains. He later attended the Australian Theatre for Young People and then enrolled at the Western Australian Academy of Performing Arts, where he studied with Hugh Jackman. He holds triple British-Irish-Australian citizenship, being British by virtue of being born in the United Kingdom before the country abolished unconditional birthright citizenship in 1983 and being Irish automatically through his Irish mother.

Personal life
Purcell was married to Rebecca Williamson from 1998 until 2008, during which time the couple had four children.

In 2011, Purcell started dating former 90210 actress AnnaLynne McCord; in 2014, the couple announced an amicable split, though they rekindled their romance a year later. McCord told People Magazine she came back into his life as a friend when the actor was diagnosed with skin cancer, but the relationship soon turned romantic again. In January 2018, McCord ended the relationship. However, on 25 September 2020 Purcell confirmed on Instagram that they had rekindled their relationship.
In November 2022, Purcell confirmed his relationship with Tish Cyrus, mother of Miley Cyrus.

On 1 June 2016, Purcell suffered severe injuries on set in Morocco, after a misplaced iron bar used as a Prison Break season 5 set piece fell on his head. He was immediately airlifted from Ouarzazate to Casablanca, where he received emergency treatment for nasal fractures and various other injuries.

Filmography

Film

As producer

Television

Video games

Awards and nominations

References

External links

 

1970 births
Living people
20th-century Australian male actors
21st-century Australian male actors
Australian male film actors
Australian male television actors
Australian expatriates in England
Australian people of English descent
Australian people of Irish descent
Australian people of Norwegian descent
British emigrants to Australia
People from Wallasey
Male actors from Sydney
Australian expatriate male actors in the United States
Western Australian Academy of Performing Arts alumni